Reverend William James Dawson (1854–1928) was an English clergyman, lecturer, and author. He was the father of Coningsby Dawson. Born at Towcester, Northamptonshire on 21 November 1854, he was educated at Kingswood School in Bath, Somerset, and Didsbury College, Manchester. He entered the Wesleyan ministry in 1875. In 1879 he married Jane Powell and had three daughters and three sons. He moved to the church of John Wesley, City Road, London in 1887. He found it extremely depressing ministering to impoverished the parish in the south side of London. Dawson wrote in Autobiography of a Mind, "All around these dismal habitations of the dead, were narrow alleys and foul rookeries, feculent with thronged and neglected human lives. The dilapidated houses looked as though they had known no cleansing or repair since the days of the Great Plague, when Bunhill Fields received the dead in thousands.(p. 177-178) Deliverance came in a whole unexpected and in a manner wholly unforeseen that a church was vacant in Glasgow where few English preachers coveted a charge so distant." (p. 189)

Glasgow

In 1888 he moved his family to Glasgow, Scotland (8 Queens Crescent). In Autobiography of a Mind Dawson wrote: "The house to which I came was one of these grey stone houses, one of the twenty or thirty in a somber crescent, built round a mangy grass plot defended with rusty railing and adorned with a broken foundation, long ago derelict" (p. 204) He described his years in Glasgow writing, "In Glasgow a different spirit reigned. Men were judged by their inherent worth. Society appeared to have a more democratic basis. I felt, for the first time, that I could breathe freely, move freely; that I was no longer badged, cataloged, and labeled. There was a more diffused intellectual life. Ideas counted for more. The common level of education was much higher than London. There was an ennobling tradition of the dignity of scholarship. The great university crowded with young from the farm and glen, who in due course would recruit to be all the learned professions, had done much to create this tradition."(p. 206)

His daughter Hilda wrote in her memoirs  : "Every Sunday morning he found a queue waiting outside his church (St. John's Chapel, Sauchihall Street), which was always crowded, both the morning and evening service. Glasgow University recognized the intellectual in him and he became a lecturer at the University and made such friends as Henry Drummond (evangelist), John Caird (theologian) and Lord Kelvin." She noted that her father found these to be his happiest and most successful years.

In 1891, Dawson made his first visit to America. In Autobiography of a Mind of this experience, he wrote "The amazing magnitude of the country, the visible progress, the spirit of hope and energy in its people, affected me, as they affect all new-comers, with a kind of mental intoxication. This brief episode dropped a seed in my mind which was not lost. It struck a deep root, and twelve year later it bore unforeseen fruit". (p. 268-269)

London

Dawson resigned from the Wesleyan ministry and entered the Congregational in 1892, Highbury Church, London. "The Congregational Church to which I was going give a larger opportunity to a free individualism, than any other church, but it was merciless to failure as my friends were quick to remind me." (p.271) In her memoir his daughter, Hilda wrote: "My farther decided to leave the Wesley Methodism, with its restrictions, furnished manses, and continually returning three-year moves with a growing family of children to be educated. Thus he accepted the call to a large congregational church (Highbury Quadrant) in North London in the residential suburb of Highbury. Here he would be returning not to the sordid and tragic London of the south side, but to semi suburban London, a London of green lawns, pleasant avenues, parks, and large comfortable homes with prosperous middle-class population. A pleasant place for his children to grow up in."

The twelve years spent at Highbury were busy and transformative for Dawson. He was a prolific writer completing The Man Jesus Christ, The Quest of the Simple Life, and The House of Dreams as well as his first attempt at writing short stories, London Idylls. He wrote in Autobiography of a Mind that the Life of Christ Jesus was totally unsuccessful in England, but attracted attention in the United States; another The Quest of the Simple Life interested Theodore Roosevelt and his first deliberate attempt at short-story writing was read before publication, the that kindliest of critics, Sir Arthur Conan Doyle (p. 292). He noting that "the great book which endures is not begotten in the womb of vanity" (p. 393), and "the whole pain of literary production lies in the sense of the disparity between aspiration and achievement; the joy is in the struggle to overcome it, the pain is in the failure to do so" (p. 295). On his arrival at Highbury he was convinced that this home was where he would live for the rest of his life. By 1901 this feeling had begun to change. He had traveled to the Holy Land and had written Life of Christ. He wrote: "... it was a rather vague suspicion that I was being worked on by spiritual influences that lay beyond my control. Things were beginning to dissolve around me, at the foot trod on crumbling earth." (p. 309).

Move to America

Hilda wrote: "In the autumn of this year (1904), my father went to America on what was intended to be a friendly visit. But his visit developed into a long series of public engagements. After he returned to London, his American friends pursued him with importunities to continue among them a career, which promised large opportunities of public usefulness. To their importunities he later yielded, but not until 1906. And so the farewell to London came on a certain morning (May 6, 1906) in Euston Station, among a crowd of sorrowing friends, young and old, all of whom were to recede slowly from any active participation in our lives. We were to sail on the S.S. Arabic - Father, Mother, Muriel, Marjorie, Eric, and myself. My brother Coningsby had already left Oxford and had gone on ahead to the Union Theological College in New York. Reggie had also left earlier to enter Guelph Agricultural College in Canada".

Dawson moved to Taunton, Massachusetts (61, Summer Street). Much of Dawson's time between 1906-2011 was occupied public lecturing. This was simply a continuation of his mode of life in England, where he lectured in almost every city and considerable town during a period of twenty years. In Twenty years in America Dawson wrote: “On a lecture platform I found an opportunity of public usefulness and a means of reputation, much wider that that afforded by the pulpit.” However Hilda wrote: “after four years of travelling my father began to consider more and more the possibility of accepting a call to a permanent ministry and settling down to home-life again.”  In 1911 Dawson left Taunton for Newark, where he was minister of the Old First Presbyterian Church (Newark, New Jersey). He retired from Newark Pastorate in 1924.

Kootenay Years

In 1906 Dawson's eldest son Coningsby happened to pass through Nelson, British Columbia. He was so taken by the area and the opportunities it afforded that he wrote to brother Reginald recommending that he consider relocating to build an orchard business. By the fall of that year the family had purchased 40 acres at Willow Point, five miles north of Nelson on the west arm of Kootenay Lake. Reginald labored to develop an apple orchard This property became a favorite destination for the whole family who traveled from America by train for the summer. Although part of the property was eventually sold the family kept about 10 acres where in 1921 Dawson built a family home on the bench above Kootenay Lake. This home was beloved by him and he continued to spend summers there until his death. In a prologue to Twenty years in America  his daughter Muriel Dawson describes his last days: "The last outdoor scene on which he looked on that afternoon on August 22, (1928) was his beloved mountains and lake with the evening shadows falling, as he sat on the terrace with little Derry (his grandchild) on his knee and pointed out to him the lake steamer come down the lake. They watched together till it vanished, then a sudden chill seized him and he went indoors never to come out again".

Works of William James Dawson
 Arvelon: a First Poem (1878)
 A Vision of Souls, with other Ballads and Poems (1884)
 Quest and Vision: Essays on Life and Literature (1886; enlarged, 1892)
 The Threshold of Manhood: a Young Man's Words to Young Men (1889)
 The Makers of Modern Poetry (1890)
 The Redemption of Edward Strahan: a Social Story (1891)
 The Church of To-morrow: a Series of Addresses Delivered in America, Canada, and Great Britain (1892)
 Poems and Lyrics (1893)
 The Makers of Modern English: a Popular Handbook to the Greater Poets of the Century (1893)
 The Making of Manhood (1894) 
 London Idylls: Tales (1895)
 The Story of Hannah: a Novel (1896)
 Thro' Lattice-Windows: [tales] (1897)
 Judith Boldero: a Tragic Romance (1898)
 In Memoriam William Ewart Gladstone: A Sermon Preached in Highbury Quadrant Church, on Sunday Evening, May 22nd, 1898 (1898)
 Makers of Modern Prose: A Popular Handbook to the Greater Prose Writers of the Century (1899)
 Savonarola: a Drama (1900)
 The Man Christ Jesus: a Life of Christ (1901)
 The House of Dreams (1901)
 Literary Leaders of Modern England (1902)
 The Reproach of Christ, and Other Sermons (1903)
 Makers of English Fiction (1905)
 The Evangelistic Note (1905)
 The Forgotten Secret (1906)
 The Makers of English Poetry (1906)
 The Makers of English Prose (1906)
 The Empire of Love (1907)
 A Prophet in Babylon: A Story of Social Service (1907)
 The Quest of the Simple Life (1907)
 A Soldier of the Future (1908)
 The Great English Letter Writers - Volume 1 (1908)
 The Great English Essayists, with Introductory Essays and Notes (1909)
 Masterman and Son: [a Novel] (1909)
 The Divine Challenge (1910)
 The Great English Short Story Writers (1910)
 One Night in Bethlehem: a Christmas Story (1910)
 The Book of Courage (1911)
 A Child's Memorial by Her Father and Brother (1911)
 The Great English Novelists - Volume 2 (1911)
 The American Hymnal (1913)
 America, and Other Poems (1914)
 Robert Shenstone: a Novel (1917)
 The Father of a Soldier (1918)
 The War Eagle: a Contemporary Novel (1918)
 Chalmers Comes Back (1919)
 The Borrowdale Tragedy (1920)
 The Autobiography of the Mind (1925)
 Twenty Years in America (unpublished manuscript)

References

External links

 
 

1854 births
1928 deaths
19th-century English male writers
19th-century English novelists
20th-century English male writers
20th-century English novelists
English Congregationalist ministers
English male novelists
English male non-fiction writers
English religious writers
People from Towcester